The Abode of the Message was a Sufi Order International (currently the  Inayati Order) community founded in 1975 by Vilayat Inayat Khan. The Abode was the central residential community of the Inayati order, a conference and retreat center, and a center of esoteric study. The property is located in the eastern heights of the Taconic Mountains in New Lebanon, New York, and includes historic Shaker buildings built between 1834 and 1870.

The described intent of the Abode as a community was to "collectively embody spiritual awakening," through "mutual commitment to practicing...the Sufi teachings," "shared devotion to the ideals of Love, Harmony and Beauty, and to the specific transformational work whereby these ideals are progressively realized," for "mutual dedication and visionary collaboration."

In April 2022, the Inayati Order announced that The Abode had been permanently closed, its board of directors had been dissolved, and the property was being put up for sale.

History of the site
Most of the Abode's Main Campus structures were built in the mid-19th century by the Mount Lebanon Shaker Village community as housing and workspaces for their South Family group. Formally established in 1787, the New Lebanon Shaker Society (renamed the Mount Lebanon Shaker Society in 1861) was the second major Shaker society formed in the recently created United States of America. The society established its home at the Mount Lebanon Shaker Village, which became the primary Shaker spiritual residential community.

The Mount Lebanon Shaker Village was organized into Family groups living in clustered buildings sited around the property. Three main groups of buildings survive as of 2010. The Church Family property is occupied by the Darrow School, a private residential high school. The North Family property is occupied and being restored by the Shaker Museum, Mount Lebanon. The South Family property was owned by the Shaker Village Work Group (a camp for urban teenagers established in 1947 as the Shaker Village Work Camp and later renamed) until it was purchased in 1975 for the Inayati Order, which established it as a new residential spiritual community—The Abode of the Message.

Facilities
Most of its shared community facilities are grouped within two areas, the Main Campus and the Mountain Conference Center.

Main Campus
The Main Campus is a cluster of buildings at the south end of Darrow Road, most of which are the original South Family structures of the Mount Lebanon Shaker Village, demonstrating "preservation through use." Many of the buildings are named for spiritual qualities that Sufis value, drawn from the 99 Names of God in Islam. Rezak was the South Family's main communal building and now contains the library and community dining room. Vakil houses the Abode Programs Office, and served as the Shaker chair-caning shop. Mughni is the former Shaker trustees building.  Fatah (the 1867 Shaker women's workhouse) holds men's and women's dorms. Recently renovated, the Shaker Barn was built in 1850 as a horse barn, but now hosts offices and art studios. The Meditation Hall was built in 1975 by Abode community members, and is used as a sacred space used for public events. Three personal retreat huts are located in the Retreat Hut Field on the hill behind the Meditation Hall, and several retreat huts and cabins are situated beside a stream south of the Shaker Barn.

Mountain Camp
The Mountain Camp hosts large group events for the Abode and The Inayati Order as well as being available as a woodland conference center. The Mountain Camp comprises dining pavilions and meeting spaces, along with shared bathroom and shower facilities for those staying on the mountain overnight. Meals are prepared in the distinctive octagonal Kitchen building. Housing on the mountain is provided by two shared cabins that hold a total of twenty two-person rooms, sixteen private huts that are simple, rustic retreat huts without electricity, and extensive space for tenting along the mountain's walking paths.

References

Newspapers and magazines

  — Issue entitled "Spiritual Communities." Magazine is now published by the Fellowship for Intentional Community.
  — Reviews of several spiritual retreat centers in the NYC area, including the Abode.

  (also archived, 4 February 2009) — Extensive reporting about the Abode, its history, and activities.
  Volume 1, number 43. — A Master Plan was created for the Abode by Dennis Wedlick Architects LLC. Article reviews its contents in the context of the site's history.
  — Reviews of several spiritual retreat centers in the downstate NY area, including the Abode.

Books

  — Describes some history of the South Family lands ownership by the Shakers, then the Shaker Village Work Camp, then the Sufi Order International.
  — The page number and the book's name differ slightly in other editions (1990 edition, ; 1996 ed., ; 2000 ed., ; 2005 ed., ; 2007 ed., ; 2010 ed.)
  — Extended history of the Mount Lebanon Shaker Village, including the South Family site.

 
  — Describes the origins of the Abode as a spiritual commune.
  — Describes the purchase of the South Family property in 1947 by Jerry and Sybil Count, who established the Shaker Village Work Camp, later renamed the Shaker Village Work Group in 1967, and finally the Shaker Village Educational Work Foundation.
  — An extensive history of the Shakers.
  — Some detailed history of the Abode.
  — An abbreviated version of Sutton 2003.
  — A short history of the Sufi Order International, with a few paragraphs about the Abode.

External links

Sufi organizations
Inayati Order
Buildings and structures in Columbia County, New York
Organizations established in 1975
1975 establishments in New York (state)